Quebec Magnetic is a live concert video album by Metallica, documenting two shows the band played at the Colisée Pepsi in Quebec City, Canada, on October 31 and November 1, 2009, on their World Magnetic Tour, released on December 11, 2012. The album is the first to be released via Metallica's own label, Blackened Recordings.

The album was announced on September 20, 2012, with fans voting online to decide which of the two shows recorded would be shown in its entirety; the remaining songs will be shown as "extras" on the album.  On October 22, the album's track list, release date and cover art was released. A 33-second teaser trailer for the album was released on November 19.

The album sold about 14,000 copies during the first week after its release, charting at number two on the Billboard Top Music Videos chart.

Track listing
The album contains songs from both shows, with songs not played in the main setlist included as extras.

Personnel
 James Hetfield – vocals, rhythm guitar
 Kirk Hammett – lead guitar, backing vocals
 Robert Trujillo – bass, backing vocals
 Lars Ulrich – drums

Chart positions

Certifications

References

Metallica live albums
2012 video albums
2012 live albums
Live video albums
Metallica video albums
Self-released albums